Greta libethris, the Libethris clearwing, is a day active ithomiine butterfly from the subfamily Ithomiinae.

Description
Wings are transparent with brown margins and yellow cross bars on the forewings.

Distribution
This species can be found in Venezuela, Bolivia, Colombia and Peru.

References

 Biolib
 "Greta Hemming, 1934" at Markku Savela's Lepidoptera and Some Other Life Forms
 Greta libethris
 Neotropical butterflies

Ithomiini
Nymphalidae of South America
Lepidoptera of Bolivia
Lepidoptera of Colombia
Lepidoptera of Peru
Lepidoptera of Venezuela
Butterflies described in 1867
Taxa named by Baron Cajetan von Felder
Taxa named by Rudolf Felder